Coleophora mediocris is a moth of the family Coleophoridae. It is found in Mongolia.

References

mediocris
Moths described in 1977
Moths of Asia